Odontopodisma rubripes is a species of insect in family Acrididae. It is endemic to Romania and small parts of Hungary, Slovakia and Ukraine.

References

Sources

Acrididae
Endemic fauna of Hungary
Insects described in 1931
Taxonomy articles created by Polbot